Alan Gifford (born John Lennox; March 11, 1911 – March 20, 1989) was an American-born actor from Taunton, Massachusetts, who worked mainly in the UK, where he died in Blairgowrie, Scotland at age 78. Known best for his role in 2001: A Space Odyssey (1968).

Gifford narrated the audio cassette version of the book I'm OK – You're OK.

Selected filmography

 The Kangaroo Kid (1950) - Steve Corbett
 The Magic Box (1951) - Industry Man (uncredited)
 It Started in Paradise (1952) - American captain (uncredited)
 Appointment in London (1953) - US General (uncredited)
 Lilacs in the Spring (1954) - Hollywood Director
 A Prize of Gold (1955) - Major Bracken
 Barbados Quest (1955) - Henry Warburg
 No Smoking (1955) - American Ambassador
 A Yank in Ermine (1955) - Colonel M'Gurk
 The Iron Petticoat (1956) - Colonel Newt Tarbell
 Satellite in the Sky (1956) - Col. Galloway
 Hour of Decision (1957) - J. Foster Green
 Across the Bridge (1957) - Cooper
 Time Lock (1957) - George Foster
 A King in New York (1957) - School Superintendent
 The Flying Scot (1957) - Phil
 Paris Holiday (1958) - American Consul
 Escapement (1958) - Wayne - Insurance Company Chief
 Screaming Mimi (1958) - Capt. Bline
 Chain of Events (1958) - Lord Fenchurch
 The Mouse That Roared (1959) - Air Raid Warden
 Too Young to Love (1960) - Mr. Elliot
 I Aim at the Stars (1960) - U.S. Army Colonel
 Brainwashed (1960) - Mac Iver
 No Kidding (1960) - Edgar Treadgold
 Visa to Canton (1961) - Charles Orme
 Town Without Pity (1961) - Gen. Stafford
 The Road to Hong Kong (1962) - American Official
 Devil Doll (1964) - Bob Garrett
 Carry On Cowboy (1965) - Commissioner
 Where the Spies Are (1966) - Security
 Drop Dead Darling (1966) - American Brasshat
 Dark of the Sun (1968) - Jansen
 2001: A Space Odyssey (1968) - Poole's Father
 Only When I Larf (1968) - Poster
 Isadora (1968) - Tour Manager (uncredited)
 Along the Way (1972)
 The Legend of Nigger Charley (1972) - Hill Carter
 Phase IV (1974) - Mr. Eldridge
 Everyday (1976)
 Ragtime (1981) - Judge
 Who Dares Wins (1982) - Sen. Kohoskie

References

External links
 

1911 births
1989 deaths
People from Taunton, Massachusetts
American male film actors
British male film actors
Male actors from Massachusetts
20th-century American male actors
20th-century British male actors
American emigrants to the United Kingdom
People associated with Perth and Kinross